The haversine formula determines the great-circle distance between two points on a sphere given their longitudes and latitudes. Important in navigation, it is a special case of a more general formula in spherical trigonometry, the law of haversines, that relates the sides and angles of spherical triangles.

The first table of haversines in English was published by James Andrew in 1805, but Florian Cajori credits an earlier use by José de Mendoza y Ríos in 1801. The term haversine was coined in 1835 by James Inman.

The formulas could equally be written in terms of any multiple of the haversine, such as the older versine function (twice the haversine). Prior to the advent of computers, the elimination of division and multiplication by factors of two proved convenient enough that tables of haversine values and logarithms were included in 19th- and early 20th-century navigation and trigonometric texts. These days, the haversine form is also convenient in that it has no coefficient in front of the  function.

Formulation
Let the central angle  between any two points on a sphere be:

where:
  is the distance between the two points along a great circle of the sphere (see spherical distance),
  is the radius of the sphere.

where
 ,  are the latitude of point 1 and latitude of point 2,
 ,  are the longitude of point 1 and longitude of point 2.

Finally, the haversine function , applied above to both the central angle  and the differences in latitude and longitude, is
 
The haversine function computes half a versine of the angle .

 

or more explicitly:
 

When using these formulae, one must ensure that  does not exceed 1 due to a floating point error ( is only real for ).  only approaches 1 for antipodal points (on opposite sides of the sphere)—in this region, relatively large numerical errors tend to arise in the formula when finite precision is used. Because  is then large (approaching , half the circumference) a small error is often not a major concern in this unusual case (although there are other great-circle distance formulas that avoid this problem).  (The formula above is sometimes written in terms of the arctangent function, but this suffers from similar numerical problems near .)

Since the haversine formula uses sines, it avoids that problem.

Either formula is only an approximation when applied to the Earth, which is not a perfect sphere: the "Earth radius"  varies from 6356.752 km at the poles to 6378.137 km at the equator.  More importantly, the radius of curvature of a north-south line on the earth's surface is 1% greater at the poles (≈6399.594 km) than at the equator (≈6335.439 km)—so the haversine formula and law of cosines cannot be guaranteed correct to better than 0.5%. More accurate methods that consider the Earth's ellipticity are given by Vincenty's formulae and the other formulas in the geographical distance article.

The law of haversines

 

Noting that , the haversine formula immediately follows.

To derive the law of haversines, one starts with the spherical law of cosines:

As mentioned above, this formula is an ill-conditioned way of solving for  when  is small.  Instead, we substitute the identity that , and also employ the addition identity , to obtain the law of haversines, above.

Proof
One can prove the formula:

by transforming the points given by their latitude and longitude into cartesian coordinates, then taking their dot product.

Consider two points  on the unit sphere, given by their latitude  and longitude :

These representations are very similar to spherical coordinates, however latitude is measured as angle from the equator and not the north pole.  These points have the following representations in cartesian coordinates:

From here we could directly attempt to calculate the dot product and proceed, however the formulas become significantly simpler when we consider the following fact: the distance between the two points will not change if we rotate the sphere along the z-axis. Note that similar considerations do not apply to transforming the latitudes - adding a constant to the latitudes may change the distance between the points. By choosing our constant to be , and setting , our new points become:

See also
Sight reduction
Vincenty's formulae

References

Further reading
 U. S. Census Bureau Geographic Information Systems FAQ, (content has been moved to What is the best way to calculate the distance between 2 points?)
 R. W. Sinnott, "Virtues of the Haversine", Sky and Telescope 68 (2), 159 (1984).
 Deriving the haversine formula, Ask Dr. Math (Apr. 20–21, 1999).  
 Romuald Ireneus 'Scibor-Marchocki, Spherical trigonometry, Elementary-Geometry Trigonometry web page (1997).
 W. Gellert, S. Gottwald, M. Hellwich, H. Kästner, and H. Küstner, The VNR Concise Encyclopedia of Mathematics, 2nd ed., ch. 12 (Van Nostrand Reinhold: New York, 1989).

External links
 Implementations of the haversine formula in 91 languages at rosettacode.org and in 17 languages on codecodex.com
 Other implementations in C++, C (MacOS), Pascal, Python, Ruby, JavaScript,  PHP,Matlab, MySQL

Spherical trigonometry
Geodesy
Distance